The Helpmann Award for Best Opera is an award presented by Live Performance Australia (LPA), the "peak body for Australia’s live entertainment and performing arts industry". It has been handed out since 2001 at the annual Helpmann Awards, which "recognise distinguished artistic achievement and excellence in the many disciplines of Australia's vibrant live performance sectors". The award is presented to the producer of an opera, that is first performed in Australia during the eligibility period.

Winners and nominees

See also
Helpmann Awards

References

External links
The official Helpmann Awards website

Opera
Opera competitions
Opera-related lists
Awards established in 2001
Classical music awards